Associazione Sportiva Dilettantistica Sacilese Calcio is an Italian association football club located in Sacile, Friuli-Venezia Giulia.
At the end of the 2010–11 Lega Pro Seconda Divisione season, the club was relegated to Serie D where it currently plays.

History

The club was founded in 1920.

From 2006–07 to 2009–10

In the 2006–07 Serie D season, the team ended 8th in Girone C. A year later, in the 2007–08 Serie D season, the team placed 4th in the same division. It qualified for the promotional playoffs but lost in the first round.

In the 2008–09 Serie D season, Sacilese placed 1st in Girone C, achieving direct promotion to Lega Pro Seconda Divisione.

In the 2009–10 Lega Pro Seconda Divisione season, Sacilese placed 11th in Girone B.

2010–11: relegated to Serie D after play-out
At the end of the 2010–11 Lega Pro Seconda Divisione season, Sacilese was ranked in 15th place with 27 points, with a record of 5 victories, 12 draws and 15 defeats, preceding Sanremese for the direct matches. The placement forced the two teams to play the relegation play-offs.

The first match was played in Sanremo on 22 May, the return at home on 29 May 2011. Sacilese lost the away match 2–1 and drew 1–1 at home, therefore relegating them to Serie D.

Colors and badge
Its colors are white and red.

References

External links
Official Site 

Football clubs in Italy
Football clubs in Friuli-Venezia Giulia
Association football clubs established in 1920
Serie C clubs
1920 establishments in Italy